The Kanije Eyalet was an administrative territorial entity of the Ottoman Empire formed in 1600 and existing until the 1699 Treaty of Karlowitz. It included parts of present-day Hungary and Croatia

History
The province of Kanije was established in 1600 after the town of Kanije was captured from Habsburgs. This newly conquered area was joined with territory of Zigetvar Province, which was formed in 1596 from some sanjaks of Budin Province (which had been expanded as a result of the Ottoman territorial gains during the Long War) and Bosnia Province. The Kanije Eyalet existed until the capture of Kanije by Habsburg Monarchy in 1690. It was formally ceded to Habsburg Monarchy by the Treaty of Karlowitz in 1699.

Administrative divisions

References

See also
 Long War (Ottoman wars)
 Ottoman Hungary
 Ottoman Croatia

Ottoman period in Hungary
Ottoman period in the history of Croatia
Eyalets of the Ottoman Empire in Europe
States and territories established in 1600
1600 establishments in the Ottoman Empire
1690 disestablishments in the Ottoman Empire